Toll interacting protein, also known as TOLLIP, is an inhibitory adaptor protein that in humans is encoded by the TOLLIP gene.

Function and regulation

It is an inhibitory adaptor protein within Toll-like receptors (TLR). The TLR pathway is a part of the innate immune system that recognizes structurally conserved molecular patterns of microbial pathogens, leading to an inflammatory immune response. 

Tollip interacts with cellular and subcellular membrane compartments such as endosome and lysosome through its C2 domain binding with phosphoinositides. By coordinating organelle communications , Tollip can contribute to the fusion of endo-lysosome and autophagosome. Mice with Tollip deletion exhibit elevated risks for inflammatory diseases such as atherosclerosis and neurodegeneration.

Clinical significance

Polymorphisms in TLR genes have been implicated in various diseases like atopic dermatitis. Recently, variations in the TOLLIP gene have been associated with tuberculosis and idiopathic pulmonary fibrosis.

Interactions 

TOLLIP has been shown to interact with TOM1, TLR 2, TLR 4 and IL1RAP.

References

Further reading